Ahmad Afghan (born 15 February 1970) was an Iranian wrestler. He competed in the 1988 Summer Olympics.

References

1970 births
Wrestlers at the 1988 Summer Olympics
Iranian male sport wrestlers
Olympic wrestlers of Iran
Date of death unknown